Krasne (Ukrainian ; Russian /; Romanian Crasna) is a village in the Odesa Oblast, Ukraine, with about 1,300 inhabitants (2001). It belongs to Tarutyne settlement hromada, one of the hromadas of Ukraine.

History 

The territory of Bessarabia was established in 1812 in Peace of Bucharest from the Ottoman Vassal Prinzipality of Moldavia together with the Budjak in Imperial Russia. The new acquisition was treated as a colonization area and initially assigned to the Bessarabia Governorate.

In 1814, colonists (mostly Germans) emigrated from the Duchy of Warsaw and established a colony in Bessarabia. Initially, the colony was given the number of the land plot in the overall survey plan on which it was located. Krasna was Steppe No. 7, often referred to as Colonia Catholica. From July 1817 onwards, it was given the name  Konstantinovskaya/Konstantinschutz which has been determined from the reading of Krasna's baptismal registrations.
From November 1817 onward, in memory of the victory Imperial Russian Army by Russian troops over the French in the Battle of Krasnoye, the village was named Krasna or Krasne.

After Bessarabia became a part of Romania in 1918, the village was known as Crasna. In 1940 the region fell under Soviet control, and the village became Krasne.

Until 18 July 2020, Krasne belonged to Tarutyne Raion. The raion was abolished in July 2020 as part of the administrative reform of Ukraine, which reduced the number of raions of Odesa Oblast to seven. The area of Tarutyne Raion was merged into Bolhrad Raion.

Geography 
Krasne is the only village in the  area of the Tarutyne municipality in Bolhrad Raion.

See also 
 Bessarabia Germans
 History of Moldova

References

External links 
 Online heritage book Krasna

Villages in Bolhrad Raion
Populated places established in 1814
Akkermansky Uyezd